Warrington Bank Quay railway station is one of three railway stations serving the town centre of Warrington in Cheshire, England. Warrington Bank Quay is a north–south oriented mainline station on one side of the main shopping area, with the west–east oriented Warrington West and Warrington Central operating a more frequent service to the neighbouring cities of Liverpool and Manchester. Cheshire Cat Buses are operated from the station into Warrington Bus Interchange and in the opposite direction to the Centre Park business park, Stockton Heath and further south into Cheshire. The station is directly on the West Coast Main Line.

Layout

The station consists of two island platforms. The easternmost retains the 19th century buildings, with the western island's buildings dating from the 1950s. Passengers enter the station at street level through a functional modern entrance containing an information office and ticket office, and proceed through a subway, reaching the elevated platforms by stairs or a lift. There is a buffet on the eastern platform.

Platform 1 serves arrivals and departures to Liverpool Lime Street with this service terminating at the platform, and occasionally for North Wales services. Platform 2 is generally used for North Wales services, and southbound intercity services to Birmingham New Street and London Euston. Platform 3 serves northbound intercity trains to Edinburgh and Glasgow Central. Platform 4 for services from North Wales to Manchester. This allows northbound departures from platform 1. The present platform 4 was numbered 5 for many years, because there was to be a north-facing bay platform in the west island which was numbered 4, but this saw no passenger use after electrification in 1972 being removed later.

The station's best known landmark is the huge Unilever detergent manufacturing plant which stands overlooking the site.

The station suffered from years of neglect and, because of this, Virgin Trains announced improvements to the station. In 2009, an extension to the existing car park and a new taxi rank were built, along with improvements to the platforms and a new ticket office and travel centre. The new entrance hall is now complete, with a ticket office and a newsagents. The buffet on the London bound platforms has been modernised, however a first class lounge is yet to materialise.

Low Level

Until 1965, 2 west-east oriented through platforms, 5 and 6   were situated on what had been the St Helens Railway lines which pass beneath the station and the north-south West Coast Main Line. (The West Coast Main Line had been elevated to pass over the west to east line when the current station was opened in 1868). Although it was not the official title, this part of the station was referred to as Bank Quay Low Level. There was also a bay platform, 7 situated at the eastern end of the site. The line remains for freight use only and there are no longer any passenger platforms on the low level station.

In the Integrated Rail Plan for the North and Midlands the UK government proposed reinstating the Low Level station as part of a new connection to Liverpool from HS2

Services
The station lies on the West Coast Main Line, operated by Avanti West Coast, with regular services to London, Birmingham, and Scotland. A regular regional express service operates between Manchester, Chester and North Wales operated by Transport for Wales. There are also local electric services to Liverpool operated by Northern and one early morning service per day to Ellesmere Port via Helsby with returning morning and afternoon services.

Normal weekday service consists of:
Hourly to London Euston direct, operated by Avanti West Coast
Hourly to London Euston via Birmingham New Street, operated by Avanti West Coast
Hourly to Glasgow Central, operated by Avanti West Coast
Two-hourly to Edinburgh Waverley, operated by Avanti West Coast
Two-hourly to Blackpool North, operated by Avanti West Coast
Hourly to Manchester Airport via Manchester Piccadilly, operated by Transport for Wales
Hourly to Llandudno, operated by Transport for Wales
Hourly to Liverpool Lime Street operated by Northern
Hourly to Leeds via Manchester Victoria operated by Northern
Hourly to Chester (express - Northern)
Hourly operated by Northern terminates here from Liverpool Lime Street
There is also a limited service to Ellesmere Port operated by Northern.

References

Bibliography

External links 

Railway stations in Warrington
DfT Category B stations
Former London and North Western Railway stations
Railway stations in Great Britain opened in 1868
Northern franchise railway stations
Railway stations served by Transport for Wales Rail
Railway stations served by Avanti West Coast
Stations on the West Coast Main Line